Marley is an English-language surname with numerous etymological origins. In many cases, the surname is derived from any of several like-named placenames in England, such as those in Devon, Kent, Lancashire (Mearley), Sussex (Marley Farm) and West Yorkshire. The placenames in Devon, Kent, and West Yorkshire are, in part, derived from the Old English element leah, meaning "woodland clearing". Early forms of the surname are de Merlai, in about 1145–1165; de Mardele, in 1208; de Marley, in 1285; and de Marleye, in 1306. In the 17th century, the surname was taken to Ireland by a family from Northumbria. However, in some cases the surname in Ireland may be an Anglicised form of the Irish-language Ó Mearthaile (another suggestion is Ó Mearlaigh; it is unlikely to be an Anglicised form of Ó Murghaile). Notable people with the surname include:

Bob Marley, Jamaican reggae musicianNotable members of Bob Marley's family include:
Rita Marley, singer
Cedella Marley Booker, singer and writer, and mother of Bob Marley
Cedella Marley, musician and clothing designer, daughter of Bob Marley
Damian Marley, reggae musician
Julian Marley, reggae musician
Ky-Mani Marley, reggae musician
Ziggy Marley, reggae musician
Stephen Marley, son of Bob Marley
Rohan Marley, former pro football player
Norval Marley, father of Bob Marley
Bob Marley, American comedian
Bert Marley, American politician from Idaho
Elsie Marley, 18th-century English alewife with a song about her
John Marley, American actor
John Marley, English mining engineer
Mickey Marley, a Northern Irish street entertainer
Peverell Marley (1899–1964), American cinematographer
Stephen Marley, British author and game designer

Fictional characters:
Jacob Marley, fictional character in A Christmas Carol
Elaine Marley, fictional character in Monkey Island (series)

References

English toponymic surnames
Surnames of Irish origin